Aleksandr Chizh (born 8 March 2002) is a Belarusian professional footballer who plays for Slonim-2017.

References

External links 
 
 

2002 births
Living people
Belarusian footballers
Association football forwards
FC Smolevichi players
FC Shakhtyor Petrikov players
FC Dnepr Rogachev players
FC Osipovichi players
FC Slonim-2017 players